The University of Notre Dame du Lac, known simply as Notre Dame or ND, is a private Catholic research university in Notre Dame, Indiana, outside the city of South Bend. French priest Edward Sorin founded the school in 1842. The main campus covers 1,261 acres (510 ha) in a suburban setting and contains landmarks such as the Golden Dome, the Word of Life mural (commonly known as Touchdown Jesus), Notre Dame Stadium, and the Basilica. Originally for men (some women earned degrees in 1918), the university did not formally accept undergraduate female students until 1972.

Notre Dame has been recognized as one of the top universities in the United States. The university is organized into seven schools and colleges. Notre Dame's graduate program includes more than 50 master, doctoral and professional degrees offered by the six schools, including the Notre Dame Law School and an MD–PhD program offered in combination with the Indiana University School of Medicine. The School of Architecture is known for teaching New Classical Architecture and for awarding the annual Driehaus Architecture Prize. The university offers more than 50 year-long study programs abroad and over 15 summer programs.

Notre Dame maintains a system of libraries, cultural venues, artistic and scientific museums, including the Hesburgh Library and the Snite Museum of Art. Most of the university's 8,000 undergraduates live on campus in one of 33 residence halls, each with its own traditions, legacies, events, and intramural sports teams. The university's approximately 134,000 alumni constitute one of the strongest college alumni networks in the U.S.

The university's athletic teams are members of the NCAA Division I and are known collectively as the Fighting Irish. Notre Dame is noted for its football team, which contributed to its rise to prominence on the national stage in the early 20th century; the team, an Independent with no conference affiliation, has accumulated 11 consensus national championships, seven Heisman Trophy winners, 62 members of the College Football Hall of Fame, and 13 of the Pro Football Hall of Fame. Notre Dame teams in other sports, chiefly in the Atlantic Coast Conference, have accumulated 17 national championships. The "Victory March" is one of the most famous and recognizable collegiate fight songs.

Notre Dame's profile grew in the early 20th century, aided by the success of its football team under coach Knute Rockne. Major improvements to the university occurred during Theodore Hesburgh's administration between 1952 and 1987. His administration increased the university's resources, academic programs, and its reputation. Since then, the university has seen steady growth, and under the leadership of the next two presidents, Edward Malloy and John I. Jenkins, many infrastructure and research expansions have been completed. Notre Dame's growth has continued in the 21st century. At the end of the fiscal year 2022, its endowment was valued at $20.3 billion, one of the largest among U.S. universities.

History

Foundations
In 1842, the bishop of Vincennes, Célestin Guynemer de la Hailandière, offered land to Edward Sorin of the Congregation of Holy Cross, on the condition that he build a college in two years. Stephen Badin, the first priest ordained in the United States, who had come to the area invited by Potawatomi chief Leopold Pokagon to minister to his tribe, had bought these  of land in 1830. Sorin arrived on the site with eight Holy Cross brothers from France and Ireland on November 26, 1842, and began the school using Badin's old log chapel. After enrolling two students, Sorin soon erected more buildings, including the Old College, the first church, and the first main building. Notre Dame began as a primary and secondary school; in 1844 it received its official college charter from the Indiana General Assembly, under the name  the University of Notre Dame du Lac (University of Our Lady of the Lake). Because the university was originally all-male, the Sisters of the Holy Cross founded the female-only Saint Mary's College near Notre Dame in 1844.

Early history
The college awarded its first degrees in 1849. As it grew under the presidency of Sorin and his successors, new academic programs were offered and new buildings built to accommodate the growing student and faculty population. The brief presidency of Patrick Dillon (1865–1866) saw the original main building replaced with a larger one, which housed the university's administration, classrooms, and dormitories. Under William Corby's first administration, enrollment at Notre Dame increased to over 500 students. In 1869, he opened the law school, which offered a two-year course of study, and in 1871 he began construction of Sacred Heart Church, today the Basilica of the Sacred Heart. Two years later, Auguste Lemonnier started a library in the Main Building, which had 10,000 volumes by 1879.
Fire destroyed the Main Building and the library collection in April 1879; the school closed immediately and students were sent home. Sorin (then provincial Superior) and President Corby immediately planned for the rebuilding of the structure that had housed virtually the entire university. Construction began on May 17, and by the incredible zeal of administrators and workers, the third and current Main Building was completed before the fall semester of 1879. The library collection was rebuilt and housed in the new Main Building.

The presidency of Thomas E. Walsh (1881–1893) focused on improving Notre Dame's scholastic reputation and standards. At the time, many students came to Notre Dame only for its business courses and did not graduate. Walsh started a "Belles Lettres" program and invited many notable lay intellectuals like writer Maurice Francis Egan to campus. Washington Hall was built in 1881 as a theater, and the Science Hall (today the LaFortune Student Center) was built in 1883 to house the science program (established in 1880) and multiple classrooms and science labs. The construction of Sorin Hall saw the first freestanding residence hall on campus and one of the first in the country to have private rooms for students, a project championed by Sorin and John Zahm. During Walsh's tenure, Notre Dame started its football program and was awarded the first Laetare Medal. The Law School was reorganized under the leadership of William J. Hoynes (dean from 1883 to 1919), and when its new building was opened shortly after his death, it was renamed in his honor.

Growth
John Zahm was the Holy Cross Provincial for the United States from 1898 to 1906, with overall supervision of the university. He sought to modernize and expand Notre Dame by erecting buildings and adding to the campus art gallery and library, amassing what became a famous Dante collection, and pushing Notre Dame towards becoming a research university dedicated to scholarship. The congregation did not renew Zahm's term fearing he had expanded Notre Dame too quickly and had run the order into serious debt. In particular, his vision to make Notre Dame a research university was at odds with that of Andrew Morrissey (president from 1893 to 1905), who hoped to keep the institution a smaller boarding school. Morrissey's presidency remained largely focused on younger students and saw the construction of the Grotto, the addition of wings to Sorin Hall, and the erection of the first gymnasium. By 1900, student enrollment had increased to over 700, with most students still following the Commercial Course.
The movement towards a research university was championed subsequently by John W. Cavanaugh, who modernized educational standards. An intellectual figure known for his literary gifts and his eloquent speeches, he dedicated himself to the school's academic reputation and to increasing the number of students awarded bachelor's and master's degrees. As part of his efforts, he attracted many eminent scholars, established a chair in journalism, and introduced courses in chemical engineering. During his time as president, Notre Dame rapidly became a significant force on the football field. In 1917, Notre Dame awarded its first degree to a woman, and its first bachelor's degree in 1922. However, female undergraduates were uncommon until 1972. James A. Burns became president in 1919 and, following in the footsteps of Cavanaugh, he oversaw an academic revolution that brought the school up to national standards by adopting the elective system and moving away from the traditional scholastic and classical emphasis in three years. By contrast, Jesuit colleges, bastions of academic conservatism, were reluctant to move to a system of electives; for this reason, Harvard Law School shut out their graduates. Notre Dame continued to grow, adding more colleges, programs, residence halls, and sports teams. By 1921, with the addition of the College of Commerce, Notre Dame had grown from a small college to a university with five colleges and a law school.

President Matthew Walsh (1922–1928) addressed the material needs of the university, particularly the $10,000 debt and the lack of space for new students. When he assumed the presidency, more than 1,100 students lived off campus while only 135 students paid for room and board. With fund-raising money, Walsh concentrated on the construction of a dormitory system. He built Freshman Hall in 1922 and Sophomore Hall in 1923, and began construction of Morrissey, Howard and Lyons Halls between 1924 and 1925. By 1925, enrollment had increased to 2,500 students, of which 1,471 lived on campus; faculty members increased from 90 to 175. On the academic side, credit hours were reduced to encourage in-depth study, and Latin and Greek were no longer required for a degree. In 1928, three years of college were made a prerequisite for the study of law. Walsh expanded the College of Commerce, enlarged the stadium, completed South Dining Hall, and built the memorial and entrance transept of the Basilica.

One of the main driving forces in the university's growth was its football team, the Notre Dame Fighting Irish. Knute Rockne became head coach in 1918. Under him, the Irish would post a record of 105 wins, 12 losses, and five ties. During his 13 years, the Irish won three national championships, had five undefeated seasons, won the Rose Bowl Game in 1925, and produced players such as George Gipp and the "Four Horsemen". Knute Rockne has the highest winning percentage (.881) in NCAA Division I/FBS football history. Rockne's offenses employed the Notre Dame Box and his defenses ran a 7–2–2 scheme. The last game Rockne coached was on December 14, 1930, when he led a group of Notre Dame all-stars against the New York Giants in New York City.

The success of Notre Dame reflected the rising status of Irish Americans and Catholics in the 1920s. Catholics rallied around the team and listened to the games on the radio, especially when it defeated teams from schools that symbolized the Protestant establishment in America—Harvard, Yale, Princeton, and Army. Its role as a high-profile flagship institution of Catholicism made it an easy target of anti-Catholicism. The most remarkable episode of violence was a clash in 1924 between Notre Dame students and the Ku Klux Klan (KKK), a white supremacist and anti-Catholic movement. The Klan decided to hold a week-long Klavern in South Bend. Clashes with the student body started on May 17, when students blocked the Klansmen from descending from their trains in the South Bend station and ripped KKK clothes and regalia. Two days later, thousands of students massed downtown protesting the Klavern, and only the arrival of college president Walsh prevented any further clashes. The next day, Rockne spoke at a campus rally and implored the students to obey Walsh and refrain from further violence. A few days later, the Klavern broke up, but the hostility shown by the students contributed to the downfall of the KKK in Indiana.

Expansion in the 1930s and 1940s

Charles L. O'Donnell (1928–1934) and John Francis O'Hara (1934–1939) fueled both material and academic expansion. During their tenures at Notre Dame, they brought many refugees and intellectuals to campus; such as W. B. Yeats, Frank H. Spearman, Jeremiah D. M. Ford, Irvin Abell, and Josephine Brownson for the Laetare Medal, instituted in 1883. O'Hara also concentrated on expanding the graduate school. New construction included Notre Dame Stadium, the law school building, Rockne Memorial, numerous residential halls, Cushing Hall of Engineering, and a new heating plant. This rapid expansion, which cost the university more than $2.8 million, was made possible in large part through football revenues. O'Hara strongly believed that the Fighting Irish football team could be an effective means to "acquaint the public with the ideals that dominate" Notre Dame. He wrote, "Notre Dame football is a spiritual service because it is played for the honor and glory of God and of his Blessed Mother. When St. Paul said: 'Whether you eat or drink, or whatsoever else you do, do all for the glory of God,' he included football."

During World War II, O'Donnell offered Notre Dame's facilities to the armed forces. The Navy accepted his offer and installed Naval Reserve Officers' Training Corps (ROTC) units on campus as part of the V-12 Navy College Training Program. Soon after the installation, there were only a few hundred civilian students at Notre Dame. O'Donnell continued O'Hara's work with the graduate school. He formalized the graduate program further and replaced the previous committee of graduate studies with a dean.

John J. Cavanaugh, president from 1946 to 1952, devoted his efforts to raising academic standards and reshaping the university administration to better serve its educational mission and an expanded student body. He stressed advanced studies and research while quadrupling the university's student population, with undergraduate enrollment seeing an increase by more than half, and graduate student enrollment growing fivefold. Cavanaugh established the Lobund Institute for Animal Studies and Notre Dame's Medieval Institute, presided over the construction of  Nieuwland Science Hall, Fisher Hall, and the Morris Inn, and the Hall of Liberal Arts (now O'Shaughnessy Hall), made possible by a donation from I. A. O'Shaughnessy, at the time the largest ever made to an American Catholic university. He also established the university's system of advisory councils.

Hesburgh era: 1952–1987

Theodore Hesburgh served as president for 35 years (1952–1987). Under his presidency, Notre Dame underwent huge growth and transformation from a school mostly known for its football to a top-tier university, academic powerhouse, and preeminent Catholic university. The annual operating budget rose by a factor of 18, from $9.7 million to $176.6 million; the endowment by a factor of 40, from $9 million to $350 million; and research funding by a factor of 20, from $735,000 to $15 million. Enrollment nearly doubled from 4,979 to 9,600; faculty more than doubled from 389 to 950, and degrees awarded annually doubled from 1,212 to 2,500.

Hesburgh made Notre Dame coeducational. Women had graduated every year since 1917, but they were mostly religious sisters in graduate programs. In the mid-1960s, Notre Dame and Saint Mary's College developed a co-exchange program whereby several hundred students took classes not offered at their home institution, an arrangement that added undergraduate women to a campus that already had a few women in the graduate schools. After extensive debate, merging with St. Mary's was rejected, primarily because of the differential in faculty qualifications and pay scales. "In American college education," explained Charles E. Sheedy, Notre Dame's dean of Arts and Letters, "certain features formerly considered advantageous and enviable are now seen as anachronistic and out of place. ... In this environment of diversity, the integration of the sexes is a normal and expected aspect, replacing separatism." Thomas Blantz, Notre Dame's vice president of Student Affairs, added that coeducation "opened up a whole other pool of very bright students". Two of the residence halls were converted for the newly admitted female students that first year, with two more converted the next school year. In 1971, Mary Ann Proctor, a transfer from St. Mary's, became the first female undergraduate. The following year, Mary Davey Bliley became the first woman to graduate from the university, with a bachelor's degree in marketing.

In 1978, a historic district comprising 21 contributing buildings was listed on the National Register of Historic Places.

Recent history

In the 18 years Edward Malloy was president, the school's reputation, faculty, and resources grew rapidly. He added more than 500 professors and the academic quality of the student body improved dramatically, with the average Scholastic Assessment Test (SAT) score rising from 1240 to 1460. The number of minority students more than doubled, the endowment grew from $350 million to more than $3 billion, the annual operating budget rose from $177 million to more than $650 million, and annual research funding improved from $15 million to more than $70 million.

Notre Dame's most recent (2014) capital campaign raised $2.014 billion, far exceeding its goal of $767 million. It was the largest in the history of Catholic higher education, and the largest of any university without a medical school at the time.

John I. Jenkins took over from Malloy in 2005 . In his inaugural address, Jenkins described his goals of making the university a leader in research that recognizes ethics and builds the connection between faith and studies. During his tenure, Notre Dame has increased its endowment, enlarged its student body, and undergone many construction projects on campus, including the Compton Family Ice Arena, a new architecture hall, and additional residence halls. Announced as an integration of "the academy, student life and athletics," construction on the  Campus Crossroads project began around Notre Dame Stadium in November 2014. Its three buildings—Duncan Student Center (west), Corbett Family Hall (east) and O'Neill Hall (south) house student life services, an indoor gym, a recreation center, the career center, a 500-seat student ballroom, the departments of anthropology and psychology, a digital media center and the department of music and sacred music program.

Campus

Notre Dame's campus is located in Notre Dame, Indiana, an unincorporated community and census-designated place in the Michiana area of Northern Indiana, north of South Bend,  from the Michigan state line. Development of the campus began in the spring of 1843, when Edward Sorin and some of his congregation built the Old College, used as a residence, a bakery, and a classroom. A year later, after an architect arrived, the first Main Building was built, and in the decades to follow, the university expanded. Today it lies on  just south of the Indiana Toll Road and includes around 170 buildings and athletic fields located around its two lakes and seven quadrangles. It is consistently ranked and admired as one of the most beautiful university campuses in the United States and around the world, and is noted particularly for the Golden Dome, the Basilica and its stained glass windows, the quads and the greenery, the Grotto, Touchdown Jesus, and its statues and museums. Notre Dame is a major tourist attraction in northern Indiana; in the 2015–2016 academic year, more than 1.8 million visitors, almost half of whom were from outside St. Joseph County, visited the campus.

A  historic district was listed on the National Register of Historic Places in 1978 as University of Notre Dame: Main and South Quadrangles. The district includes 21 contributing buildings in the core of the original campus such  as the Main Administration Building and the Basilica.

Administration and academic buildings 
The Main Building serves as the center for the university's administrative offices, including the Office of the President. Its golden dome, topped by the statue of Mary, is the campus' most recognizable landmark. When the second iteration of the main building burned down in 1879, the third and current structure was built in record time. The main building is located on Main Quad (also known as "God Quad"), which is the oldest, most historic, and most central part of campus. Behind the main building stand several facilities with administrative purposes and student services, including Carole Sadner Hall, Brownson Hall, and St. Liam's Hall, the campus health center.

There are several religious buildings The current Basilica of the Sacred Heart is on the site of Sorin's original church, which had become too small for the growing college. It is built in French Revival style, with stained glass windows imported from France. Luigi Gregori, an Italian painter invited by Sorin to be an artist in residence, painted the interior. The basilica also features a bell tower with a carillon. Inside the church, there are sculptures by Ivan Meštrović. The Grotto of Our Lady of Lourdes, built in 1896, serves as a replica of the original in Lourdes and is a popular spot for prayer and meditation. The Old College building has become one of two seminaries on the campus run by the Congregation of Holy Cross.

Academic buildings are concentrated in the Center-South and Center-East sections of campus. McCourtney Hall, an interdisciplinary research facility, opened its doors for the fall 2016 semester, and ground was broken on the  Walsh Family Hall of Architecture on the south end of campus near the DeBartolo Performing Arts Center opened in fall 2018. Since 2004, several buildings have been added, including the DeBartolo Performing Arts Center, the Guglielmino Complex, and the Jordan Hall of Science. A new engineering building, Stinson-Remick Hall, a new combination Center for Social Concerns/Institute for Church Life building, Geddes Hall, and a law school addition were completed at the same time. Many academic buildings were built with a system of libraries, the most prominent of which is the Hesburgh Library, built in 1963 and today containing almost four million books. The Stayer Center for Executive Education, which houses the Mendoza College of Business Executive Education Department, opened in March 2013 just South of the Mendoza College of Business building.

Residential and student buildings 

There are 33 single-sex undergraduate residence halls. The university has recently announced a co-educational undergraduate dorm community based in one of the graduate residential apartments. Most of the graduate students on campus live in one of four graduate housing complexes on campus. A new residence for men, Baumer Hall, was built in 2019. Johnson Family Hall, for women, was also completed and opened that semester. The South Dining Hall and North Dining Hall serve the student body.

The campus hosts several entertainment, general purpose, and common spaces. LaFortune Student Center, commonly known as "LaFortune" or "LaFun," is a four-story building built in 1883 that serves the student union and hosts social, recreational, cultural, and educational activities. LaFortune hosts many businesses (including restaurant chains), student services, and divisions of The Office of Student Affairs. A second student union came with the addition of Duncan Student Center, which is built onto the Notre Dame Stadium as part of the Campus Crossroads projects. As well as additional food service chains, recreation facilities, and student offices, Duncan also hosts a student gym and a ballroom.

Athletics facilities 
Because of its long athletic tradition, the university features many athletic buildings, which are concentrated in the southern and eastern sections of campus. The most prominent is Notre Dame Stadium, home of the Fighting Irish football team; it has been renovated several times and today can seat over 80,000 people. Prominent venues include the Edmund P. Joyce Center, with indoor basketball and volleyball courts, and the Compton Family Ice Arena, a two-rink facility dedicated to hockey. There are many outdoor fields, such as the Frank Eck Stadium for baseball.

The former Alumni Senior Club opened in September 2003 after a $3.5 million renovation and became an all-ages student hang-out. Legends is made up of two parts: The Restaurant and Alehouse and the nightclub.

Environmental sustainability
The Office of Sustainability was created in the fall of 2007 at the recommendation of a Sustainability Strategy Working Group and appointed the first director in April 2008. The pursuit of sustainability is related directly to the Catholic mission of the university. In his encyclical Laudato si', Pope Francis stated, "We need a conversation which includes everyone, since the environmental challenge we are undergoing, and its human roots, concern and affect us all." Other resources and centers on campus focusing on sustainability include the Environmental Change Initiative, Environmental Research Center, and the Center for Sustainable Energy at Notre Dame. The university also houses the Kellogg Institute for International Peace Studies.

Notre Dame received a gold rating from the Association for the Advancement of Sustainability in Higher Education (AASHE) in 2014; in 2017 it was downgraded to silver. In 2016, the Office of Sustainability released its Comprehensive Sustainability Strategy to achieve its goals in a wide area of university operations. , 17 buildings have achieved LEED-Certified status, with 12 of them earning Gold certification. Notre Dame's dining service sources 40 percent of its food locally and offers sustainably caught seafood and many organic, fair-trade, and vegan options. In 2019, irrigation systems' improvements led to 244 million fewer gallons of water being used and a 50 percent reduction in water consumption over 10 years.

In 2015, Notre Dame announced major environmental sustainability goals, including eliminating using coal by 2020 and reducing its carbon footprint by half by 2030. Both these goals were reached in early 2019. This was achieved by implementing energy conservation, energy efficiency strategies, temperature setpoints, low-flow water devices, and diversifying its energy sources and infrastructures. New sources of renewable energy on campus include geothermal wells on East Quad and by the Notre Dame Stadium, substitution of boilers with gas turbines, solar panels on Fitzpatrick Hall and Stinson-Remick Hall and off-campus, a hydroelectric facility at Seitz Park in South Bend powered by the St. Joseph River, and heat recovery strategies. Future projects outlined by the university's utilities long-range plan include continual diversification of its energy portfolio, future geothermal wells in new buildings and some existing facilities, and a collaboration with the South Bend Solar Project. Current goals include cutting Notre Dame's carbon footprint by 83 percent by 2050 and eventually becoming carbon neutral, diverting 67 percent of all waste from landfills by 2030.

Global Gateways

The university owns several centers around the world used for international studies and research, conferences abroad, and alumni support.
London. The university has had a presence in London since 1968. Since 1998, its London center has been based in Fischer Hall, the former United University Club in Trafalgar Square. The center hosts the university's programs in the city, and conferences and symposia. The university also owns a residence facility, Conway Hall, for students studying abroad.
Beijing. The university owns space in the Liangmaqiao Station area. The center is the hub of Notre Dame Asia. It hosts a number of programs including study abroad.

Dublin. The university owns the O'Connell House, a building in Merrion Square in the heart of Georgian Dublin. It hosts academic programs and summer internships for both undergraduate and graduate students in addition to seminars, and is home to the Keough Naughton Centre. Since 2015, the university has partnered with Kylemore Abbey, renovating spaces in the abbey so it could host academic programs.
Jerusalem. The Jerusalem Global Gateway shares space with the university's Tantur Ecumenical Institute, in a  facility on the seam between Jerusalem and Bethlehem. It hosts religious and ecumenical programs.
Rome. The Rome Global Getaway is on Via Ostilia, very close to the Colosseum. It was recently acquired and renovated and now has  of space to host a variety of academic activities. The university purchased a second Roman villa on the Caelian hill.

In addition to the five Global Gateways, the university also owns the Santa Fe Building in Chicago, where it offers its executive Master of Business Administration program. The university also hosts  Global Centers located in Santiago, São Paulo, Mexico City, Hong Kong, and Mumbai.

Community development
The first phase of Eddy Street Commons, a $215 million development adjacent to campus funded by the university, broke ground in June 2008. The project drew union protests when workers hired by the City of South Bend to construct the public parking garage picketed the private work site after a contractor hired non-union workers. The $90 million second phase broke ground in 2017.

Organization and administration

The university's president is always a priest of the Congregation of Holy Cross. The first president was Edward Sorin; and the current president is John I. Jenkins. , John McGreevy is the provost overseeing academic functions.
Until 1967, Notre Dame had been governed directly by the Congregation. Under the presidency of Theodore Hesburgh, two groups, the Board of Fellows, and the Board of Trustees, were established to govern the university. The 12 fellows are evenly divided between members of the Holy Cross order and the laity; they have final say over the operation of the university. They vote on potential trustees and sign off on all that board's major decisions. The trustees elect the president and provide general guidance and governance to the university.

Endowment
Notre Dame's endowment was started in the early 1920s by university president James Burns; it was $7 million by 1952 when Hesburgh became president.  In fiscal year ending in 2021, the university endowment market value was $18.07 billion, though more recently it reported its value at approximately $13.3 billion.

Academics

Colleges and schools
The College of Arts and Letters was established as the university's first college in 1842. The first degrees were granted seven years later. The university's first academic curriculum was modeled after the Jesuit Ratio Studiorum from Saint Louis University. Today, the college, housed in O'Shaughnessy Hall, includes 20 departments in the areas of fine arts, humanities, and social sciences, and awards Bachelor of Arts (B.A.) degrees in nearly 70 majors and minors, making it the largest of the university's colleges. There are more than 3,000 undergraduates and 1,100 graduates enrolled in the college, taught by 500 faculty members.

The College of Science was established in 1865. The curriculum involved six years of coursework, including higher-level mathematics. Today, the college, housed in the Jordan Hall of Science, includes over 1,200 undergraduates in several departments, each awarding Bachelor of Science (B.S.) degrees. According to university statistics, its science pre-professional program has one of the highest acceptance rates to medical school of any university in the United States.
The Notre Dame Law School was established in 1869 and is the oldest law program at a Catholic university in the United States. In 2021 the school ranked 22nd among the top American law schools by U.S. News & World Report. The law school grants the professional Juris Doctor degree, as well as the graduate Master of Laws, and Doctor of Juridical Science degrees. It was ranked seventeenth in graduates attaining federal judicial clerkships in 2020. and seventh in graduates attaining Supreme Court clerkships.

The School of Architecture was established in 1899, the year after Notre Dame first granted degrees in the field. Today, the school, housed in Bond Hall, offers a five-year undergraduate program leading to a bachelor's degree. All undergraduates spend their third year in Rome. The faculty teaches (pre-modernist) traditional and classical architecture and urban planning (e.g., following the principles of New Urbanism and New Classical Architecture). It also awards the annual Driehaus Architecture Prize.
The College of Engineering was established in 1920; however, courses in civil and mechanical engineering had been taught in the College of Science, since the 1870s. Today, the college, housed in the Fitzpatrick, Cushing, and Stinson-Remick Halls of Engineering, includes five departments of study, with eight B.S. degrees offered. The college also offers five-year dual degree programs with the College of Arts and Letters and the College of Business awarding additional B.A. and Master of Business Administration (MBA) degrees, respectively.
The Mendoza College of Business was established in 1921 by John Francis O'Hara, although a foreign commerce program had been launched in 1917. Today, the college offers degrees in accountancy, finance, management, and marketing and enrolls over 1,600 students. In 2016, Bloomberg Businessweek ranked Mendoza's undergraduate program as second in the country, after five consecutive years in the first position. For its 2023 ranking, U.S. News & World Report ranked the graduate school 25th, tied with Vanderbilt University.
The Keough School of Global Affairs was established in 2014. The first new school in nearly a century, it builds on the presence of seven institutes founded for international research, scholarship, and education at Notre Dame. The school offers six doctoral programs related to international peace studies, a Masters in Global Affairs focused on either peace studies or sustainable development, and five undergraduate majors. It is focused on the study of global governance, human rights, and other areas of global social and political policy. A $50 million gift from Donald Keough, a former Coca-Cola executive, and his wife Marilyn funded the school's creation. The school opened officially in August 2017, in Jenkins Hall on Debartolo Quad.

Special programs
Every Notre Dame undergraduate is part of one of the school's five undergraduate colleges or is in the First Year of Studies program.

The First Year of Studies program was established in 1962 to guide freshmen through their first year at the school before they have declared a major. Each student is assigned an academic advisor who helps them choose classes that give them exposure to any major in which they are interested. The program includes a Learning Resource Center, which provides time management, collaborative learning, and subject tutoring. It has been recognized as outstanding by U.S. News & World Report. First Year of Studies is designed to encourage intellectual and academic achievement and innovation among first-year students. It includes programs such as FY advising, the Dean's A-list, the Renaissance circle, NDignite, the First Year Urban challenge, and more.

Every admissions cycle, the Office of Undergraduate Admissions selects a small number of students for the Glynn Family Honors Program, which grants top students within the College of Arts and Letters and the College of Science access to smaller class sizes taught by distinguished faculty, endowed funding for independent research, and dedicated advising faculty and staff.

Graduate education

Each college offers graduate education in the form of master's and doctoral programs. Most of the departments in the College of Arts and Letters offer PhDs, while a professional Master of Divinity (M.Div.) program also exists. All of the departments in the College of Science offer PhDs, except for the Department of Pre-Professional Studies. The School of Architecture offers a Master of Architecture, while each of the departments of the College of Engineering offer PhDs. The College of Business offers multiple professional programs, including MBA and Master of Science in Accountancy programs. It also operates facilities in Chicago and Cincinnati for its executive MBA program. The Alliance for Catholic Education program offers a Master of Education program, where students study at the university during the summer and teach in Catholic elementary schools, middle schools, and high schools across the South for two school years.

The university first offered graduate degrees, in the form of a Master of Arts (MA), in the 1854–1855 academic year. The program expanded to include Master of Laws (LLM) and Master of Civil Engineering in its early stages of growth, before a formal graduate school education was developed with a thesis not required to receive the degrees. This changed in 1924, with formal requirements developed for graduate degrees, including offering doctorates.

Although Notre Dame does not have its own medical school, it offers a combined MD–PhD though the regional campus of the Indiana University School of Medicine, where Indiana medical students may spend the first two years of their medical education before transferring to the main medical campus at Indiana University–Purdue University Indianapolis.

Centers and institutes

The university hosts several centers and institutes. These include the Center for Social Concerns, the Eck Institute for Global Health, the Institute for Educational Initiatives, the Keough-Naughton Institute for Irish Studies, the Kroc Institute for International Peace Studies, the McGrath Institute for Church Life, the Medieval Institute, the Nanovic Institute for European Studies, and the Tantur Ecumenical Institute. There are also several college-based institutes such as the University of Notre Dame Environmental Research Center (UNDERC), the Harper Cancer Research Institute, the Initiative for Global Development, the Institute for Flow Physics and Control, the Institute for Latino Studies, the Liu Institute for Asia and Asian Studies, and the Wireless Institute.

In 2019, Notre Dame announced plans to rename the Center for Ethics and Culture, an organization focused on spreading Catholic moral and intellectual traditions. The new  A $10 million gift from Anthony and Christie  funded the Center for Ethics and Culture. The university is also home to the McGrath Institute for Church Life, which "partners with Catholic dioceses, parishes and schools to address pastoral challenges with theological depth and rigor". The Joan B. Kroc Institute for International Peace Studies, founded in 1986 through donations Joan B. Kroc, the surviving spouse of McDonald's owner Ray Kroc, and inspired by Father Hesburgh, is dedicated to research, education, and outreach, on the causes of violent conflict and the conditions for sustainable peace. It offers Ph.D., master's, and undergraduate degrees in peace studies. It has contributed to international policy discussions about peace building practices.

Libraries

The university's library system is divided between the main library, the 14-story Theodore M. Hesburgh Library, and each of the colleges and schools. The Hesburgh Library, completed in 1963, is the third building to house the main collection. The Word of Life mural by Millard Sheets, popularly known as "Touchdown Jesus" because of its proximity to Notre Dame Stadium and Jesus' arms appearing to make the signal for a touchdown adorns the front of the library.

The library system also includes branch libraries for Architecture, Chemistry and Physics, Engineering, Law, and Mathematics and information centers in the Mendoza College of Business, the Kellogg Institute for International Studies, the Joan B. Kroc Institute for International Peace Studies, and a slide library in O'Shaughnessy Hall. A theology library, opened in the fall of 2015 on the first floor of Stanford Hall, is the first branch of the library system to be housed in a dorm room. With over three million volumes, the library system was the single largest university library in the world at the time of completion. It remains one of the hundred largest libraries in the country.

Admissions

Admission to Notre Dame is highly competitive; the fall 2022 incoming class admitted 3,420 from a pool of 26,509 applicants for 12.9 percent acceptance rate. The academic profile of the enrolled class continues to rate among the top 10 to 15 in the nation for national research universities. In the class of 2020, 48 percent were in the top one percent of their high school, and 94 percent were in the top 10 percent. The median SAT score was 1500 and the median ACT score was 34. The university practices a non-restrictive early action policy that allows admitted students to consider admission to Notre Dame and any other colleges that accepted them. This process admitted 1,675 of the 9,683 (17 percent) who requested it. While all entering students begin in the College of the First Year of Studies, 26 percent have indicated they plan to study in the liberal arts or social sciences, 21 percent in engineering, 26 percent in business, 24 percent in science, and 3 percent in architecture.

Tuition 
Tuition for full-time students at the University of Notre Dame in 2023 is $62,693 a year.

Room and board is estimated to be an additional $17,378 a year for students who live in campus housing. Notre Dame is a private university, so it offers the same tuition for in-state and out-of-state students.

Rankings

Notre Dame has been recognized as one of the top universities in the United States. In 2022, Notre Dame ranked 9th for "best undergraduate teaching", 22th for "best value" school and tied for 18th overall among "national universities" in the United States in U.S. News & World Reports Best Colleges report. The school ranked 18th in U.S. News & World Reports 2022 Best University Rankings report. U.S. News ranks Mendoza College of Business undergraduate school as tied for 12th best in the U.S. in 2020. The Philosophical Gourmet Report ranks Notre Dame's graduate philosophy program as 17th nationally. According to PayScale, undergraduate alumni of University of Notre Dame have a mid-career median salary $110,000, making it the 24th-highest among colleges and universities in the United States. The median starting salary of $55,300 ranked 58th in the same peer group. Named by Newsweek as one of the "25 New Ivies,"

The university is a member of the Oak Ridge Associated Universities Consortium.

Research

Science
Joseph Carrier, director of the Science Museum and the library, was a professor of chemistry and physics until 1874. Carrier taught that scientific research and its promise for progress were not antagonistic to the ideals of intellectual and moral culture endorsed by the Catholic Church. One of Carrier's students, John Augustine Zahm, was made professor and co-director of the science department at 23; by 1900, he was a nationally prominent scientist and naturalist. He was active in the Catholic Summer School movement, which introduced Catholic laity to contemporary intellectual issues. His book Evolution and Dogma (1896) defended certain aspects of evolutionary theory as true, and argued, moreover, that even the great church teachers, Thomas Aquinas and Augustine, taught something like it. The intervention of Irish American Catholics in Rome prevented Zahm's censure by the Vatican. In 1913, Zahm and former President Theodore Roosevelt embarked on a major expedition through the Amazon.

In 1882, Albert Zahm, John's brother, built an early wind tunnel to compare lift to drag of aeronautical models. Around 1899, Professor Jerome Green became the first American to send a wireless message. In 1931, Julius Nieuwland performed early work on basic reactions that were used to create neoprene. The study of nuclear physics at the university began with the building of a nuclear accelerator in 1936, and continues now partly through a partnership in the Joint Institute for Nuclear Astrophysics.

Humanities

Richard T. Sullivan taught English from 1936 to 1974 and published six novels, dozens of short stories, and other works. He was known as a regional writer and a Catholic spokesperson.

Frank O'Malley was an English professor during the 1930s–1960s. Influenced by philosophers Jacques Maritain, John U. Nef, and others, O'Malley developed a concept of Christian philosophy that was a fundamental element in his thought. Through his course "Modern Catholic Writers", O'Malley introduced generations of undergraduates to Gabriel Marcel, Graham Greene, Evelyn Waugh, Sigrid Undset, Paul Claudel, and Gerard Manley Hopkins.

In 1939, Waldemar Gurian founded The Review of Politics, modeled after German Catholic journals. It quickly emerged as part of an international Catholic intellectual revival, offering an alternative vision to positivist philosophy. For 44 years, the Review was edited by Gurian, Matthew Fitzsimons, Frederick Crosson, and Thomas Stritch. Intellectual leaders included Gurian, Maritain, O'Malley, Leo Richard Ward, F. A. Hermens, and John U. Nef. It became a major forum for political ideas and modern political concerns, especially from a Catholic and scholastic tradition.

Kenneth Sayre has explored the history of the Philosophy department. He stresses the abandonment of official Thomism to the philosophical pluralism of the 1970s, with attention to the issue of being Catholic. He pays special attention to the charismatic personalities of Ernan McMullin and Ralph McInerny, key leaders of the department in the 1960s and 1970s.

The College of Arts and Letters is distinguished for its contributions in the field of theology and religious studies, while its affiliated Medieval Institute is the largest center for medieval studies in North America.

Current research
As of 2019, research continued in many fields. President Jenkins described his hope that Notre Dame would become "one of the pre-eminent research institutions in the world" in his inaugural address. The university has many multi-disciplinary research institutes, including the Medieval Institute, the Kellogg Institute for International Studies, the Kroc Institute for International Peace Studies, and the Center for Social Concerns. Recent research includes work on family conflict and child development, genome mapping, the increasing trade deficit of the United States with China, studies in fluid mechanics, computational science and engineering, supramolecular chemistry, and marketing trends on the Internet. , the university was home to the Notre Dame Global Adaptation Index, which ranks countries annually based on how vulnerable they are to climate change and how prepared they are to adapt. In the fiscal 2019, the university received the all-time high research funding of $180.6 million, an increase of $100 million from 2009 and a 27 percent increase from the previous year, with top funded and cutting-edge projects including vector-borne diseases, urbanism, environmental design, cancer, psychology, economics, philosophy of religion, particle physics, nanotechnology, and hypersonics. Notre Dame has a strong background in the humanities, with 65 National Endowment for the Humanities fellowships, more than any other university. Focus areas include anti-poverty economic strategy, the premier Medieval Institute, Latino studies, sacred music, Italian studies, Catholic studies, psychology, aging and stress, social good, and theology. In the sciences, research focuses and specialized centers include the Harper Cancer Research Institute, the Boler-Parseghian Center for Rare and Neglected Diseases, the Center for Nano Science and Technology, the Center for Stem Cells and Regenerative Medicine, the Eck Institute for Global Health, the Joint Institute for Nuclear Astrophysics, the University of Notre Dame Environmental Research Center, Topology and Quantum Field Theory, the Nuclear Physics Research Group, and the Environmental Change Initiative.

European émigrés

The rise of Hitler and other dictators in the 1930s forced many Catholic intellectuals to flee Europe; President John O'Hara brought many of them to Notre Dame. Anton-Hermann Chroust, in classics and law, and Waldemar Gurian, a German Catholic intellectual of Jewish descent, came from Germany. Positivism dominated American intellectual life in the 1920s onward, but in marked contrast, Gurian received a German Catholic education, and wrote his doctoral dissertation under Max Scheler. Ivan Meštrović, a renowned sculptor, brought Croat culture to campus. Yves Simon brought the insights of French studies in the Aristotelian-Thomistic tradition of philosophy to the university in the 1940s; his teacher, Jacques Maritain, was a frequent visitor to campus.

The exiles developed a distinctive emphasis on the evils of totalitarianism. For example, the political science courses of Gerhart Niemeyer discussed communist ideology and were accessible to his students. He came to the university in 1955 and was a frequent contributor to the National Review and other conservative magazines. In 1960 Hesburgh, at the urging of Niemeyer and political science department head, Stanley Parry, invited Eric Voegelin (1901–1985), who had escaped Nazi-occupied Austria, to guest lecture at Notre Dame, which he did until his retirement in 1968.

Student life

As of Fall 2020, the Notre Dame student body consisted of 12,681 students, with 8,731 undergraduates and 3,950 graduate and professional (Law, M.Div., Business, MEd) students. An estimated 21–24 percent of students are children of alumni, and the student body represents all 50 states and 88 countries. Thirty-seven percent of students come from the Midwestern United States, and 40 percent of students are U.S. students of color, eight percent are international citizens.

Residence halls

The residence halls, or dorms, are the focus of student social and intramural life. Each hall is led by a rector, a full-time, live-in professional who serves as leader, chief administrator, community builder and university resource to the residents, and is a priest, religious sister or brother, or a layperson trained in ministry and/or education. Rectors direct the hall community, foster bonding, and often coordinate with professors, academic advisors, and counselors to watch over students and assist them with their personal development. Rectors select, hire, train, and supervise hall staff: resident assistants (required to be seniors) and assistant rectors (graduate students). Many residence halls also have a priest or faculty members in residence as faculty fellows, who provide an additional academic and intellectual experience to residential hall life. Every hall has its own chapel, dedicated to the hall's patron saint, and liturgical schedule with masses celebrated multiple times a week during the academic year, in the tradition of individual chapels at English university colleges.

Fraternities and sororities are not allowed on campus, as they are described as in opposition to the university's educational and residential mission. The residential halls provide the social and communal aspect of fraternities, but in line with the university's policy of inclusion and zero tolerance of hazing, and according to former director of admissions, Dan Saracino, without "any of the disadvantages [of the Greek system] – rush, the cliques, deciding on whether you're good enough to join them, monthly 'dues' and a much lower diversity of people living together".

Over four-fifths of students live in the same residence hall for three consecutive years and about one-third of students live in the same residence hall for all four years . A new policy was put into effect beginning in 2018, which required undergraduates to live on-campus for three years. In spring 2019, the university also announced a policy that prohibited students living off campus from participating in dorm activities, such as intramural sports and dorm dances. Most intramural (interhall) sports are based on residence hall teams, where the university offers the only non-military academy program of full-contact intramural American football. At the end of the interhall football season, the championship game is played in Notre Dame Stadium.

Student clubs

There are over 400 active student clubs at the University of Notre Dame, with the financial oversight of each club delegated by the student-run Club Coordination Council. The university subsidizes clubs, providing almost 15 percent of clubs' collective projected expenditures of $2.2 million during the 2018–2019 academic year. There are a variety of student clubs on campus, including nine for students from different states, about three dozen clubs that represent different nationalities and origins, and clubs dedicated to Catholic theology, diverse faith practices, social service, political advocacy and awareness, competitive athletics, professional development and networking, performing arts, academic debate, foreign affairs, fraternal brotherhood, women's empowerment, and many other interests. The university hosts their annual Student Activities Fair early in the fall semester for all students interested in joining clubs or other student organizations.

Student union

The Notre Dame Club Coordination Council (or simply the Club Coordination Council (CCC)) is the branch of the Student Union of the university responsible for communicating issues facing undergraduate club issues, providing funding for undergraduate clubs, serving as the representative body of undergraduate student clubs, and working with student clubs to ensure that clubs can coordinate their programming of activities. The CCC oversees around 400 student clubs, each of which serves a unique purpose. The approval of the council, along with that of the Notre Dame Student Activities Office, is a requirement for official recognition of student clubs.

Student events
Website BestColleges.com ranks the university's intramural sports program as number one in the country in 2021.  Over 700 teams participate each year in the annual Bookstore Basketball tournament; while the Notre Dame Men's Boxing Club hosts the annual Bengal Bouts tournament to raise money for the Holy Cross Missions in Bangladesh. In the fall, the Notre Dame Women's Boxing Club hosts an annual Baraka Bouts tournament that raises money for the Congregation of the Holy Cross Missions in Uganda.

Many of the most popular student events held on campus are organized by the 30 residential halls. Among these, the most notable are the Keenan Revue, the Fisher Hall Regatta, Keenan Hall Muddy Sunday, the Morrissey Hall Medallion Hunt, the Dillon Hall Pep Rally, the Keough Hall Chariot Race and many others. Each dorm also hosts many formal and informal balls and dances each year.

Religious life

While having a religious affiliation is not a criterion for admission, over 93 percent of students identify as Christian, with over 80 percent of those being Catholic. There are 57 chapels on campus, including one in every residence hall. Collectively, Catholic Mass is celebrated over 100 times per week on campus, and a large campus ministry program provides for the faith needs of the community. There is also an active council of the Knights of Columbus on campus, which is the oldest and largest college council of the international Catholic men's organization. Non-Catholic religious organizations on campus include the Baptist Collegiate Ministry (BCM), Jewish Club of Notre Dame, the Muslim Student Association, the Orthodox Christian Fellowship, the Chi Alpha Christian Fellowship, and many more.

The university is the major seat of the Congregation of Holy Cross (albeit not its official headquarters, which are in Rome). Its main seminary, Moreau Seminary, is on the campus across St. Joseph Lake from the Main Building. Old College, the oldest building on campus near the shore of St. Mary's Lake, houses undergraduate seminarians. Retired priests and brothers reside in Fatima House (a former retreat center), Holy Cross House, and Columba Hall near the Grotto.

Student-run media
Notre Dame students run nine media outlets: three newspapers, a radio and television station, and several magazines and journals.

Print
The Scholastic magazine, begun as a one-page journal in 1876, is issued twice monthly and claims to be the oldest continuous collegiate publication in the United States. The other magazine, The Juggler, is released twice a year and focuses on student literature and artwork. The Dome yearbook is published annually. The newspapers have varying publication interests, with The Observer published daily and mainly reporting university and other news, staffed by students from both Notre Dame and Saint Mary's College. Unlike Scholastic and The Dome, The Observer is an independent publication and does not have a faculty advisor or any editorial oversight from the university. In 2003, when other students believed that the paper had a liberal bias, they started The Irish Rover, a print and digital newspaper published twice per month that features regular columns from alumni and faculty and coverage of campus matters. As of 2005, The Observer and the Irish Rover were distributed to all students. In Spring 2008, Beyond Politics, an undergraduate journal for political science research, made its debut.

Radio
WSND-FM serves the student body and the larger South Bend community at 88.9 FM, offering students a chance to become involved in bringing classical music, fine arts and educational programming, and alternative rock to the airwaves.

Another radio station, WVFI, began as a partner of WSND-FM; it now airs independently and is streamed on the Internet.

Television
The television station NDtv grew from one show in 2002 to a full 24-hour channel with original programming by 2006.

Athletics

Notre Dame's sports teams are known as the Fighting Irish. They compete as a member of the National Collegiate Athletic Association (NCAA) Division I, primarily competing in the Atlantic Coast Conference (ACC) for all sports—except football—since the 2013–14 school year. Men's ice hockey is played in the Big Ten conference Notre Dame men compete in baseball, basketball, cross country, fencing, football, golf, ice hockey, lacrosse, soccer, swimming and diving, tennis and track and field; women's sports are basketball, cross country, fencing, golf, lacrosse, rowing, soccer, softball, swimming and diving, tennis, track and field, and volleyball. The football team competes as a Football Bowl Subdivision (FBS) Independent since its inception in 1887, except for 2020, when it competed as part of the Atlantic Coast Conference. Both fencing teams compete in the Midwest Fencing Conference. 

Notre Dame's sports conference affiliations, except football and fencing, changed in July 2013 because of major conference realignment, and its fencing affiliation changed in July 2014. The Irish left the Big East for the ACC during a prolonged period of instability in the Big East; while they maintain their football independence, they have committed to playing five games per season against ACC opponents.  After Notre Dame joined the ACC, the conference announced it would add fencing as a sponsored sport beginning in the 2014–15 school year.

There are many theories behind the adoption of the team name but it is known that the Fighting Irish name was used in the early 1920s with respect to the football team, and alumnus Francis Wallace popularized it in his New York Daily News columns. Notre Dame's official colors are navy blue and gold. Green is sometimes worn because of the Fighting Irish nickname.

The Notre Dame Leprechaun is the mascot of the athletic teams. Created by Theodore W. Drake in 1964, the leprechaun was first used on the football pocket schedule and later the football program covers. Time featured it on a November 1964 cover.

Since its inception in 2011, Fighting Irish Media (FIM), made up of part-time student workers and full time producers, has filmed nearly all Fighting Irish sporting events for live digital and linear broadcasts. With the installation of a videoboard in Notre Dame Stadium in Fall 2017, FIM has taken over video board production for all Fighting Irish teams.

In 2014, the University of Notre Dame and Under Armour reached an agreement whereby the company provides uniforms, apparel, equipment, and monetary compensation to Notre Dame for 10 years. This contract, worth almost $100 million, was the most lucrative in the history of the NCAA at that time.

According to some analysts, without direct connection to the university or its athletic department, Notre Dame promotes Muscular Christianity through its athletic programs.

Football

The Notre Dame football team's history began when the Michigan team brought the game to Notre Dame in 1887 and played against a group of students. Since then, 13 Fighting Irish teams have won consensus national championships (although the university only claims 11), along with another nine teams being named national champions by at least one source. The program has the most members in the College Football Hall of Fame, is tied with Ohio State for the most Heisman Trophies won by players, and has the 3rd highest winning percentage in NCAA history, behind Ohio State and Alabama. Notre Dame has accumulated many rivals; the annual game against USC for the Jeweled Shillelagh has been described as one of the greatest in college football.

George Gipp, the school's legendary football player of the late 1910s, played semi-professional baseball and smoked, drank, and gambled when not playing sports. He was described as humble, generous to the needy, and a man of integrity. In 1928, coach Knute Rockne used his final conversation with the dying Gipp to inspire the Notre Dame team to beat Army and "win one for the Gipper"; that scene became the climax of the 1940 film, Knute Rockne, All American, starring Pat O'Brien as Rockne and Ronald Reagan as Gipp.

The team competes in the 80,795-seat Notre Dame Stadium. The current head coach is Marcus Freeman, who was promoted to head coach after Brian Kelly departed Notre Dame to coach at LSU at the end of the 2021 regular season.

Forbes ranked the program college football's eighth most valuable for its average annual revenue of $120 million. It has a TV contract with NBC worth an estimated $15 million per year and one of the country's largest fan bases.

Football game-day traditions

During home games, activities occur all over campus and dorms decorate their halls with a traditional item (e.g., Zahm Hall's two-story banner). Traditional activities begin at midnight with the Drummers' Circle, involving the Band of the Fighting Irish's drumline beginning the other festivities that will continue the rest of the game day Saturday. Later that day, the trumpet section will play the Notre Dame Victory March and the Notre Dame Alma Mater under the dome. The entire band will play a concert at the steps of Bond Hall, then march into the stadium, leading fans and students alike across campus to the game.

Men's basketball

As of the 2020–2021 season, the men's basketball team has over 1,910 wins and appeared in 36 NCAA tournaments Former player Austin Carr holds the record for most points scored in a single game of the tournament with 61. Although the team has never won the NCAA Tournament, they were named by the Helms Athletic Foundation as national champions twice. The team has orchestrated a number of upsets of top-ranked teams, the most notable of which was ending UCLA's record 88-game winning streak in 1974. Notre Dame has beaten an additional eight number-one teams, and those nine wins rank second, to UCLA's 10, all-time in wins against the top team.

The team plays in the newly renovated Purcell Pavilion (within the Edmund P. Joyce Center), which reopened for the 2009–2010 season. The team is coached by Mike Brey, who, as of the 2020–21 season, his 22nd at Notre Dame, has achieved a 449–248 record. In 2009, Notre Dame was invited to the NIT, where they reached the semi-finals. The 2010–11 team concluded its regular season ranked number seven in the country, with a record of 25–5, Brey's fifth straight 20-win season, and a second-place finish in the Big East. During the 2014–15 season, the team went 32–6 and won the ACC tournament, later advancing to the Elite 8, where they lost on a missed final shot against then-undefeated Kentucky. Led by NBA draft picks Jerian Grant and Pat Connaughton, the Fighting Irish beat the eventual national champion Duke Blue Devils twice during the season. The 32 wins were the most by the Fighting Irish team since 1908–09.

Other sports

Notre Dame has won an additional 14 national championships in sports other than football. Three teams have won multiple national championships; the fencing team leads with 10, followed by the men's tennis and women's soccer teams each with two. The men's cross country, and golf teams have won one and Notre Dame women's basketball has won two.

In the first 10 years that Notre Dame competed in the Big East Conference its teams won a total of 64 championships. , the women's swimming and diving team holds the Big East record for consecutive conference championships in any sport with 14 straight conference titles (1997–2010).

Band and "Victory March"
The Band of the Fighting Irish was formed in 1846 and is the oldest university band in continuous existence. The marching band plays at home games for most sports. It regularly plays the school's fight song, the Notre Dame "Victory March", identified as the most played and most famous fight song by Northern Illinois professor William Studwell. According to College Fight Songs: An Annotated Anthology published in 1998, the "Victory March" is the greatest fight song. It was honored by the National Music Council as a "Landmark of American Music" during the United States Bicentennial. The song is featured in the movies Knute Rockne, All American, Airplane!, and Rudy.

Two brothers wrote the "Victory March". Michael J. Shea, a 1904 graduate, wrote the music, and his brother, John F. Shea, who earned degrees in 1906 and 1908, wrote the original lyrics. The lyrics were revised in the 1920s; it first appeared under the copyright of the University of Notre Dame in 1928. The chorus is: 
Cheer, cheer for old Notre Dame,
Wake up the echoes cheering her name,
Send a volley cheer on high,
Shake down the thunder from the sky.
What though the odds be great or small
Old Notre Dame will win over all,
While her loyal sons are marching
Onward to victory.

Alumni

The school has over 130,000 alumni and 275 alumni clubs around the world. Notre Dame is ranked among the universities with strongest alumni networks. Many give the university yearly monetary support. Notre Dame is ranked among schools with the highest alumni donation rates. A school-record of 53.2 percent of alumni donating was set in 2006. Many buildings, including residence halls, on campus are named for major donors. Classroom buildings, and the performing arts center are also named for donors.

Alumni working in politics include state governors, members of the United States Congress, and former United States secretary of state Condoleezza Rice. Notable alumni from the College of Science are Eric F. Wieschaus, winner of the 1995 Nobel Prize in medicine, and Philip Majerus, discoverer of the cardioprotective effects of aspirin. Many university officials are alumni, including the current president, John Jenkins. Alumni in media include talk show hosts Regis Philbin and Phil Donahue, and television and radio personalities such as Mike Golic and Hannah Storm. A number of sports alumni have continued their careers in professional sports, such as Joe Theismann, Joe Montana, Tim Brown, Ross Browner, Rocket Ismail, Ruth Riley, Jeff Samardzija, Jerome Bettis, Justin Tuck, Craig Counsell, Skylar Diggins-Smith, Brett Lebda, Olympic fencing gold medalist Mariel Zagunis and bronze medalist Nick Itkin, professional boxer Mike Lee, former football coaches such as Charlie Weis, Frank Leahy and Knute Rockne, and Basketball Hall of Famers Austin Carr and Adrian Dantley. Other notable alumni include prominent businessman Edward J. DeBartolo Jr. and astronaut Jim Wetherbee. Two alumni have received the Presidential Medal of Freedom (Alan Page and Edward J. DeBartolo Jr.), and two the Congressional Gold Medal (Thomas Anthony Dooley III and Bill Hanzlik).

Popular culture
The University of Notre Dame is the setting of several works of fiction, as well as the alma mater of some fictional characters. In mid-20th century America it became "perhaps the most popular symbol of Catholicism", as noted by The Routledge Companion to Religion and Popular Culture:

Film
Knute Rockne, All American is a 1940 biographical film which tells the story of Knute Rockne, Notre Dame football coach.
The "Win one for the Gipper" speech was parodied in the 1980 movie Airplane! when, with the Victory March rising to a crescendo in the background, Dr. Rumak, played by Leslie Nielsen, urged reluctant pilot Ted Striker, played by Robert Hays, to "win just one for the Zipper", Striker's war buddy, George Zipp. The Victory March also plays during the film's credits.
Rudy is a 1993 account of the life of Daniel "Rudy" Ruettiger, who harbored dreams of playing football at Notre Dame despite significant obstacles.

Television
President Josiah Bartlet from the show The West Wing is a Notre Dame graduate, and the First Lady Abigail Bartlet attended Saint Mary's College. Danny Concannon, a member of the White House press corps, is also a graduate of Notre Dame. Actor Martin Sheen specifically asked that his character be a Notre Dame alumnus, due to the Catholicism shared by both the actor and the character.

Other media
The song This Too Shall Pass by OK Go and its video were created in collaboration with the Notre Dame Marching Band and the video shot on the university campus.

See also
Notre Dame Shakespeare Festival, held on campus every summer

Notes

References

Further reading
Burns, Robert E. Being Catholic, Being American: The Notre Dame Story, 1934–1952, Vol. 2. (2000). 632pp. excerpt and text search
Corson, Dorothy V. A Cave of Candles: The Spirit, History, Legends and Lore of Notre Dame and Saint Mary's (2006), 222pp.
Hesburgh, Theodore M. God, Country, Notre Dame: The Autobiography of Theodore M. Hesburgh (2000)
McAvoy, Thomas T. "Notre Dame, 1919–1922: The Burns Revolution." Review of Politics 1963 25(4): 431–450. in JSTOR
McAvoy, Thomas T. Father O'Hara of Notre Dame (1967)
Massa, Mark S. Catholics and American Culture: Fulton Sheen, Dorothy Day, and the Notre Dame Football Team. (1999). 278 pp.
Miscamble, Wilson D. American Priest: The Ambitious Life and Conflicted Legacy of Notre Dame's Father Ted Hesburgh (2019) online
O'Brien, Michael. Hesburgh: A Biography. (1998). 354 pp.
O'Connell, Marvin R. Edward Sorin. (2001). 792 pp.
Pilkinton, Mark C. Washington Hall at Notre Dame: Crossroads of the University, 1864–2004 (University of Notre Dame Press, 2011) 419 pp.
Rice, Charles E., Ralph McInerny, and Alfred J. Freddoso. What Happened to Notre Dame? (2009) laments the weakening of Catholicism at ND
Robinson, Ray. Rockne of Notre Dame: The Making of a Football Legend. (1999). 290 pp.
Sperber, Murray. Shake Down the Thunder: The Creation of Notre Dame Football. (1993) 634 pp.
Yaeger, Don and Looney, Douglas S. Under the Tarnished Dome: How Notre Dame Betrayed Its Ideals for Football Glory. (1993). 299 pp.

External links

Notre Dame Athletics website

 
1842 establishments in Indiana
Association of Catholic Colleges and Universities
Buildings and structures in St. Joseph County, Indiana
Catholic universities and colleges in Indiana
Education in St. Joseph County, Indiana
Educational institutions established in 1842
Historic districts on the National Register of Historic Places in Indiana
History of Catholicism in Indiana
Holy Cross universities and colleges
National Register of Historic Places in St. Joseph County, Indiana
Notre Dame, Indiana
Roman Catholic Diocese of Fort Wayne–South Bend
Tourist attractions in St. Joseph County, Indiana
University and college buildings on the National Register of Historic Places in Indiana